David Kutyauripo (born 7 March 1979) is a Zimbabwean former international footballer who last played as a defender for Dynamos.

Career
Kutyauripo began his career in 2003 with Njube Sundowns, and spent the 2005–06 season with Cypriot side APOP Kinyras Peyias, making 22 league appearances. After returning to Zimbabwe in 2006, Kutyauripo has played with Dynamos, CAPS United, Monomotapa United and Shooting Stars. On 20 October 2012 was banned for ten years for match fixing.

References

1979 births
Living people
Zimbabwean footballers
Zimbabwean expatriate footballers
Zimbabwe international footballers
APOP Kinyras FC players
Dynamos F.C. players
CAPS United players
Njube Sundowns F.C. players
Monomotapa United F.C. players
Shooting Stars F.C. (Zimbabwe) players
Cypriot First Division players
Expatriate footballers in Cyprus
Zimbabwean expatriate sportspeople in Cyprus
Association football defenders